At the 1912 Summer Olympics in Stockholm, one cycling event was contested on Sunday, 7 July. This event was a time trial which also counted as an individual race. For the only time in Olympic history, no track cycling events were held.

Amateur definitions
In cycling, where, according to the agreement made by the national associations affiliated to the Union Cycliste Internationale, every amateur was to be provided with a certificate issued by the Union or by one of the said associations.

The amateur regulation was as follows:

The competition is only open to amateurs with a license from the Union Cycliste Internationale or any affiliated to the above-mentioned Union. A certified copy of such license shall accompany each entry.

Medal summary

Participating nations
A total of 123 cyclists from sixteen nations competed at the Stockholm Games:

Medal table

References

External links
 International Olympic Committee medal database

 
1912 Summer Olympics events
1912
1912 in road cycling
1912 in cycle racing